Daniel Tyrkas (born 16 June 1975) is a German former snowboarder. He competed in the men's halfpipe event at the 2002 Winter Olympics.

References

External links
 

1975 births
Living people
German male snowboarders
Olympic snowboarders of Germany
Snowboarders at the 2002 Winter Olympics
Sportspeople from Erlangen
21st-century German people